is a Japanese voice actress. She is affiliated with I'm Enterprise.

Voice roles

TV animation
2009
K-ON! (Student)
The Girl Who Leapt Through Space (Mitchan)

2010
Ōkami-san & Her Seven Companions (Saitou's)
Kiss×sis (Riko Suminoe)
K-ON! (First Year Student)
Chu-Bra!! (Clerk, Female Student, Student, Suzuki)

2011
The IDOLM@STER (Child A)
Heaven's Memo Pad (Vocalist)
Zoobles! (Coron)
The Qwaser of Stigmata II (Ayame Satsuki)
Softenni (Azusa Mizumori, Female Student)
Hanasaku Iroha (Motoko, Student A, Student C)

2012
Upotte!! (Fara)
Campione! (Pandora)
Koi to Senkyo to Chocolate (Schoolgirl A)
Saki Episode of Side A (Riko Yasufuku, Hitomi Ezaki)
Joshiraku (Fund-Raising Student)
Say "I love you." (Girl)
Muv-Luv Alternative: Total Eclipse (Imperial Army Soldier F, Soldier)
High School DxD (Mittelt)
Hidamari Sketch × Honeycomb (Arisawa's friend, Cafeteria lady, Female student A, Female teacher, Girl D)
Bodacious Space Pirates (April Lambert)
Little Busters! (Mio Nishizono)
Lagrange - The Flower of Rin-ne (Emiri Nozu)

2013
Cuticle Detective Inaba (Noah)
Day Break Illusion (Ginka Shirokane)
Leviathan: The Last Defense (Ninja)
Tamako Market (Committee Chairman)
Angel's Drop (Hibachi)
Problem Children Are Coming from Another World, Aren't They? (Leticia Draculair)
Ro-Kyu-Bu! SS (Mayumi Odaka, Nobue Okuda)

2014
Witch Craft Works (Gibraltar)
Daimidaler the Sound Robot (Humboldt, Reporter)
Selector Infected Wixoss (Honoka)
Narihero www (Prato Bon)
No-Rin (Announcer)
The Irregular at Magic High School (Shizuku Kitayama)

2015
Etotama (Shima)
Charlotte (Nomura)
Tantei Team KZ Jiken Note (Aya Tachibana)
Durarara!!×2 Shō (Tsukiyama)
Durarara!! ×2 The Second Arc (Girl)
Ultimate Otaku Teacher (Miho Kitō)
Dog Days" (Jonu Crafty, Kanata)

2017
Classroom of the Elite (Haruka Hasebe)
The Irregular at Magic High School: The Movie – The Girl Who Summons the Stars (Shizuku Kitayama)

2018
 Uma Musume Pretty Derby (Hishi Amazon)

2020
The Irregular at Magic High School: Visitor Arc (Shizuku Kitayama)
Dropout Idol Fruit Tart (Tone Honmachi)
Wandering Witch: The Journey of Elaina (Sister)

2021
The Honor Student at Magic High School (Shizuku Kitayama)

2022
Classroom of the Elite 2nd Season (Haruka Hasebe)

2023
By the Grace of the Gods 2nd Season (Miyabi)

Original video animation (OVA)
2008
Kiss×sis (Riko Suminoe)
2012
Holy Knight (Chizuru Makimura)
Otome wa Boku ni Koishiteru: Futari no Elder (Utano Sasō)

Games
Blue Roses: Yousei to Aoi Hitomi no Senshitachi
Hyperdevotion Noire: Goddess Black Heart
Granblue Fantasy (Philosophia)
Hyrule Warriors (Agitha)
Sword Art Online: Hollow Realization (Premiere)
Sword Art Online: Fatal Bullet (Premiere)
Azur Lane (Bremerton, Asashio)
Uma Musume Pretty Derby (Hishi Amazon)

Drama CD
My Little Monster (Asako Natsume)

References

External links

1987 births
Japanese voice actresses
Voice actresses from Osaka Prefecture
Living people
21st-century Japanese actresses
I'm Enterprise voice actors